John 1:17 is the seventeenth verse in the first chapter of the Gospel of John in the New Testament of the Christian Bible.

Content
In the original Greek according to Westcott-Hort, this verse is:
Ὅτι ὁ νόμος διὰ Μωσέως ἐδόθη, ἡ χάρις καὶ ἡ ἀλήθεια διὰ Ἰησοῦ Χριστοῦ ἐγένετο.  

In the King James Version of the Bible the text reads:
For the law was given by Moses, but grace and truth came by Jesus Christ.

The New International Version translates the passage as:
For the law was given through Moses; grace and truth came through Jesus Christ.

Analysis
Lapide points out that the Law was threefold with a moral, judicial, and ceremonial law. To the two first require grace to be observed. The effect of grace is one could fulfil the same law from love to God, and so deserves eternal life. However, the ceremonial law opposes truth, for the ceremonies were only types and shadows of Christ and His sacraments.

Commentary from the Church Fathers
Chrysostom: "Or we have received grace for grace; that is, the new in the place of the old. For as there is a justice and a justice besides, an adoption and another adoption, a circumcision and another circumcision; so is there a grace and another grace: only the one being a type, the other a reality. He brings in the words to show that the Jews as well as ourselves are saved by grace: it being of mercy and grace that they received the law. Next, after he has said, Grace for grace, he adds something to show the magnitude of the gift; For the law was given by Moses, but grace and truth were made by Jesus Christ. John when comparing himself with Christ above had said, He is preferred before me: but the Evangelist draws a comparison between Christ, and one much more in admiration with the Jews than John, viz. Moses. And observe his wisdom. He does not draw the comparison between the persons, but the things, contrasting grace and truth to the law: the latter of which he says was given, a word only applying to an administrator; the former made, as we should speak of a king, who does everything by his power: though in this King it would be with grace also, because that with power He remitted all sins. Now His grace is shown in His gift of Baptism, and our adoption by the Holy Spirit, and many other things; but to have a better insight into what the truth is, we should study the figures of the old law: for what was to be accomplished in the New Testament, is prefigured in the Old, Christ at His Coming filling up the figure. Thus was the figure given by Moses, but the truth made by Christ."

Augustine: "Or, we may refer grace to knowledge, truth to wisdom. Amongst the events of time the highest grace is the uniting of man to God in One Person; in the eternal world the highest truth pertains to God the Word."

In popular culture
In the Halo video game franchise, the game's protagonist Master Chief's real name is John-117, a possible reference to the Biblical verse.

References

External links
Other translations of John 1:17 at BibleHub

01:17